Barton Warren Stone (December 24, 1772 – November 9, 1844) was an American evangelist during the early 19th-century Second Great Awakening in the United States. First ordained a Presbyterian minister, he and four other ministers of the Washington Presbytery resigned after arguments about doctrine and enforcement of policy by the Kentucky Synod. This was in 1803, after Stone had helped lead the mammoth Cane Ridge Revival, a several-day communion season attended by nearly 20,000 persons.
       
Stone and the others briefly founded the Springfield Presbytery, which they dissolved the following year, resigning from the Presbyterian Church altogether. They formed what they called the Christian Church, based on scripture rather than a creed representing the opinion of man. He later became allied with Alexander Campbell, a former Presbyterian minister who was also creating an independent path, sometimes allied with Baptists, and formed the Restoration Movement. Stone's followers were first called "New Lights" and "Stoneites". Later he and Campbell brought the groups together that relied solely on the Scriptures.

Several church groups have historical roots in Stone's efforts. The three main groups are the Churches of Christ, the Christian Church (Disciples of Christ), and the independent Christian churches and churches of Christ. Additionally, there are the International Churches of Christ, the International Christian Church, the Churches of Christ in Australia, the Churches of Christ in Europe, and the Evangelical Christian Church in Canada.

Early life and education
Stone was born to John and Mary Warren Stone near Port Tobacco, Maryland on December 24, 1772.  His immediate family was upper-middle class, with connections to Maryland's upper class of planters.  The first Protestant governor of Maryland, William Stone, was an ancestor; and one of the signers of the United States Declaration of Independence, Thomas Stone, was his second cousin.

Mary Stone was a member of the Church of England and Barton had been christened by a priest named Thomas Thornton.  After Barton's father died in 1775, his mother moved the family to Pittsylvania County, Virginia in 1779, then on the frontier. After the move to the Virginia frontier during the war, Mary joined the Methodists.  Barton was not himself notably religious as a young man; he found the competing claims of the Episcopalians, Baptists, and Methodists confusing, and was much more interested in politics.

Barton entered the Caldwell Log College, in Greensboro, North Carolina, in 1790. While there, Stone heard James McGready (an evangelical Presbyterian minister) speak. A few years later, he was ordained as a Presbyterian minister.

Career
As Stone looked more deeply into the beliefs of the Presbyterians, especially the Westminster Confession of Faith, he doubted that some of the church beliefs were truly Bible-based. He was unable to accept the Calvinistic doctrines of total depravity, unconditional election and predestination. He also believed that "Calvinism's alleged theological sophistication had . . . been bought at the price of fomenting division" and "blamed it . . . for producing ten different sects within the Presbyterian tradition alone."

The huge Cane Ridge Revival of 1801 was "set up as a traditional Presbyterian 'sacramental occasion'," similar to the one he attended earlier that same year in Logan County which was later called the Revival of 1800. Like its predecessor, Cane Ridge continued for two to three days amid much fervor. Attracting an estimated 20,000 people, Stone was one of eighteen Presbyterian ministers, along with a number of Baptist and Methodist preachers who attended the participants. Traditional elements included the "large number of ministers, the action sermon, the tables, the tent, the successive servings" of communion, all part of the evangelical Presbyterian tradition and "communion season" known in Scotland.

In a disagreement with the Kentucky synod over its determination to censure a minister for what they said was deviation from doctrine of the Westminster Confession of Faith, in 1803 Stone and four other ministers formed the Springfield Presbytery. By 1804 the Springfield Presbytery had attracted 15 congregations in Ohio and Kentucky.  The leaders of this newer presbytery became concerned by its growth, because they did not want to create a new denomination or "party".  Ultimately convinced that their newer Springfield Presbytery was sectarian, the ministers dissolved it on June 28, 1804.
  

To publicize the dissolution, they signed a document entitled The Last Will and Testament of the Springfield Presbytery.  This tract willed that "this body die, be dissolved, and sink into union with the Body of Christ at large."  It expressed the desire for Christian union and identified the Bible as the only standard of Christian faith and practice. In addition to signing the Last Will and Testament, they agreed to take "no other name than christians" on the basis that it was "the name first given by divine authority to the disciples of Christ." Soon, they adopted the name "Christian" to identify their group. Thus, remnants from the Springfield Presbytery eventually became known as the Christian Church. It is estimated that the Christian Church numbered about 12,000 by 1830.

Elias Smith had heard of the Stone movement by 1804, and the O'Kelly movement by 1808. The three groups "declared themselves one" by 1810. At that time the combined movement had a membership of approximately 20,000. This loose fellowship of churches was called by the names "Christian Connection/Connexion" or "Christian Church."

In 1819 Stone moved with his family to Georgetown, Kentucky, where he had been hired as principal of the Rittenhouse academy, which became Georgetown College in 1829. In 1834 the Stones moved to Jacksonville, Illinois, in part to be able to free slaves whom his wife had inherited. This was not possible in Kentucky because they were attached to the estate. His mother-in-law's will bequeathed the slaves to his wife and her children in perpetuity in a way that placed them under the control of trustees.  Moving to a free state allowed the Stones to emancipate them. Stone was a proponent of abolition and an active supporter of the American Colonization Society, which promoted sending free blacks to a colony in Africa (this was the basis of Liberia). By 1833 Stone had become disillusioned by the lack of success of the colonization efforts and began to support the immediate abolition of slavery.

The "Christian" movement associated with Stone merged with the  "Disciples" movement led by Alexander Campbell in 1832. This was formalized at the High Street Meeting House in Lexington, Kentucky with a handshake between Barton W. Stone and "Raccoon" John Smith. Smith had been chosen, by those present, to speak in behalf of the followers of the Campbells. A preliminary meeting of the two groups was held in late December 1831, culminating with the merger on January 1, 1832.  Campbell had been publishing the Christian Baptist since 1823, and Stone the Christian Messenger since 1826. Through these publications, they had begun bringing their followers closer together in uniting under Christ.

When the Christians and Disciples united in 1832, only a minority of Christians from the Smith/Jones and O'Kelly movements participated. Those who did were from congregations on the frontier, west of the Appalachian Mountains, that had come into contact with the Stone movement. The eastern members had several key differences from the Stone and Campbell group: an emphasis on conversion experience, quarterly observance of communion, and nontrinitarianism.

Stone died on November 9, 1844 in Hannibal, Missouri at the home of his daughter. His body was buried on his farm in Morgan County, Illinois. When the farm was sold, descendants had his remains reinterred at Antioch Christian Church east of Jacksonville. In 1847 his remains were moved again and reinterred at Cane Ridge, Kentucky.

A marble obelisk there is inscribed:
The church of Christ at Cane Ridge and other generous friends in Kentucky have caused this monument to be erected as a tribute of affection and gratitude to Barton W. Stone, minister of the gospel of Christ and the distinguished reformer of the nineteenth century. Born December 24, 1772: died November 9, 1844. His remains lie here. This monument erected in 1847.

Theological controversy
Stone was ordained Presbyterian but rejected many things from the Westminster Confession of Faith. In particular he had issues with the classical view of the Trinity. He denied being Unitarian, Arian or Socinian but he did have a subordinationist view of Christ. In addition to his issues with the Trinity, he also took issue with the prevailing understanding of Christian Atonement. He did not believe that Jesus died in man's place as substitutionary sacrifice; his views are more in line with the "moral influence theory" of Charles Finney.

Stone outlined his views on the Trinity in a publication called An Address to the Christian Churches in Kentucky, Tennessee & Ohio on Several Important Doctrines of Religion.

Charles Chilton Moore
Stone's grandson, Charles Chilton Moore, initially became a preacher in the tradition of his father and grandfather, but he later became one of America's most famous atheists and founded the Blue Grass Blade, a newspaper which he used to promote atheism and criticise religion.

Legacy and honors
1847 - A monument was erected in Stone's honor at his gravesite in Cane Ridge, Kentucky
Barton College (formerly Atlantic Christian College) in Wilson, North Carolina was named in his honor.

Citations

References
West, Earl Irvin (2002). The Search for the Ancient Order, Vol. 1. Gospel Light Publishing Company. 
Foster, Douglas A.(Editor), Blowers, Paul M.(Editor), Dunnavant, Anthony L.(Editor), Williams, D. Newell(Editor). The Encyclopedia of the Stone-Campbell Movement. Wm. B. Eerdmans Publishing Company, Grand Rapids, Michigan. 
John Rogers, THE BIOGRAPHY OF ELD. BARTON W. STONE, WRITTEN BY HIMSELF: WITH ADDITIONS AND REFLECTIONS, (Cincinnati: J.A. & U.P. James, 1847), 120–29, at Dr. Hans Rollman, Restoration Movement Website, Abilene Christian University
North, James B. Union in Truth: an Interpretive History of the Restoration Movement.

Further reading
Garrison, Winfred Earnest and DeGroot, Alfred T. (1948). The Disciples of Christ, A History, St Louis, Missouri: The Bethany Press
McAlister, Lester G. and Tucker, William E. (1975), Journey in Faith: A History of the Christian Church (Disciples of Christ), St. Louis: Chalice Press,

External links

Writings of Barton W. Stone, Abilene Christian University
Disciples of Christ Historical Society, Holds artifacts and records relating to Barton Stone.
Autobiography (published posthumously in 1847).

1772 births
1844 deaths
19th-century American Episcopalians
19th-century Presbyterian ministers
American abolitionists
American Disciples of Christ
American Presbyterian ministers
Christian Church (Disciples of Christ) clergy
Churches of Christ
Ministers of the Churches of Christ
Nondenominational Christianity
People from Port Tobacco Village, Maryland
Presbyterian abolitionists
Restoration Movement
Stone family
19th-century American clergy